Liparis burkei is a fish from the genus Liparis. It lives in shallow waters in marine environments in the demersal zone. Liparis burkei grows to a maximum length of 8.3 cm (in standard length) and is found in the Northwestern Pacific Ocean by Japan.

References

Liparis (fish)
Taxa named by David Starr Jordan
Taxa named by William Francis Thompson
Fish described in 1914